Colin Sullivan (born 24 June 1951) is an English former footballer who played at left back for most of his career. At the time of his debut he was the youngest to play for Plymouth Argyle. As of 2013 he runs a gardening business.

He began his career at Plymouth Argyle, training with the amateur players on Tuesday and Thursday evenings, and made his debut away to Rotherham United on 19 March 1968, three months before his seventeenth birthday. He remained with the club until June 1974 when he was transferred to Norwich City for £70,000, making his debut for the club on 17 August 1974 against Blackpool. He went on to appear in the 1975 Football League Cup Final for the club losing 1 – 0 to Aston Villa at Wembley. He moved in February to Cardiff City where he remained until 1981 and a brief spell at Hereford United. He then appeared for Portsmouth and Swansea City before leaving the league in 1986 to play for Locks Heath.

References

1951 births
Living people
English footballers
England under-23 international footballers
English Football League players
Plymouth Argyle F.C. players
Norwich City F.C. players
Cardiff City F.C. players
Hereford United F.C. players
Portsmouth F.C. players
Swansea City A.F.C. players
Locks Heath F.C. players
People from Saltash
Association football defenders
Footballers from Cornwall